The John A. Millar Civic Center is an arena in Houlton, Maine with a maximum seating capacity of 3,260. The building was rebuilt and expanded in 1999-2000 after the roof collapsed due to snow in 1998. The Millar Civic Center is widely known as a community center. The arena is used primarily for youth hockey as well as for fairs, trade shows and wedding receptions.

References

External links
 John A. Millar Civic Center

Sports venues completed in 2000
Buildings and structures in Houlton, Maine
Indoor ice hockey venues in Maine